The Fort Lauderdale Florida Temple is a temple of the Church of Jesus Christ of Latter-day Saints (LDS Church) in Davie near Fort Lauderdale, Florida. It is the 143rd temple of the LDS Church.

History

The announcement that a temple would be built in south Florida was made by church president Thomas S. Monson on October 3, 2009, during the church's semi-annual general conference. The temple was announced concurrently with the Brigham City Utah, Concepción Chile, Fortaleza Brazil and Sapporo Japan temples. It is the second temple constructed in Florida and the first in the heavily populated southern part of the state. The state's other temple, in Orlando, was completed in 1994.

Subsequent to the announcement, a local church official indicated that the temple would likely be constructed somewhere in western Broward County rather than within the city of Fort Lauderdale itself. No specific location was disclosed.

Ground was broken on June 18, 2011. A public open house took place from March 29 to April 19, 2014. The temple was formally dedicated on May 4, 2014, by Dieter F. Uchtdorf of the church's First Presidency. The temple is designed to serve an estimated 25,000 church members in South Florida.

The temple was given a 2014 South-East Engineering Award for best built building.

In 2020, the Fort Lauderdale Florida Temple was closed in response to the coronavirus pandemic.

See also

 Comparison of temples of The Church of Jesus Christ of Latter-day Saints
 List of temples of The Church of Jesus Christ of Latter-day Saints
 List of temples of The Church of Jesus Christ of Latter-day Saints by geographic region
 Temple architecture (Latter-day Saints)
 The Church of Jesus Christ of Latter-day Saints in Florida

References

External links
Fort Lauderdale Florida Temple Official site
Fort Lauderdale Florida Temple at ChurchofJesusChristTemples.org

21st-century Latter Day Saint temples
Churches in Fort Lauderdale, Florida
Temples (LDS Church) in Florida
Religious buildings and structures completed in 2014
2014 establishments in Florida